The following is a list of human clusters of differentiation (or CD) molecules.

* = group; 
** = not listed on hcdm

References

External links
 AbCam antigen poster

 
Human clusters of differentiation